Sergi Durán Bernad (born 23 June 1976) is a former professional tennis player from Spain.

Career
Duran was able to qualify for the 1997 Wimbledon Championships but had to battle hard in the qualification stages, winning his match against Gastón Etlis 9–7 in the final set and beating David Nainkin 11–9 in the deciding set. He faced British wildcard Andrew Richardson in the opening round and lost in straight sets.

He competed in the singles and doubles (with Gabriel Silberstein) at the Croatia Open that year but wasn't able to get past the first round in either. The Spaniard was defeated by Dominik Hrbatý in both matches, partnering Karol Kučera in the doubles.

References

1976 births
Living people
Spanish male tennis players